The 2008 America Baseball Cup was held in the Venezuelan cities of Puerto Ordaz and El Tigre, from September 26 to October 7. The tournament acted as a qualifier for the 2009 World Cup.

"America Baseball Cup" is the English translation of the competition's Spanish name, which is Copa America de Beisbol. The competition was used to select the teams that represented Central and South America — including the Caribbean — in the Baseball World Cup.

Format and participation
The tournament is split up into 2 groups. Group A consists of Venezuela, Nicaragua, Colombia, Netherlands Antilles and Mexico, and Group B consists of Puerto Rico, Brazil, Aruba, Guatemala and Panama.

Cuba did not compete because they already qualified for the 2009 World Cup as they were Olympic competitors the same year.

Results
Puerto Rico won the tournament, defeating Nicaragua 4:1 in the final.

Final Standing

Notable players
 C: César Quintero, Panama (.577/.593/.846)
 1B: Carlos Rivera, Puerto Rico (MVP) (.375/.444/.719, 3 HR, 10 RBI)
 2B: Ofilio Castro, Nicaragua (.480/.536/.640, 7 R, 7 RBI)
 SS: Andy González, Puerto Rico (.379/.455/.517, 8 R)
 3B: Agustín Murillo, Mexico (.323/.353/.742, 4 2B, 3 HR, 7 R, 11 RBI)
 OF: Willie Vasquez, Venezuela (.414/.469/.483)
 OF: Ardley Jansen, Netherlands Antilles (.444/.467/.963, 4 HR, 8 R, 8 RBI)
 OF: Danilo Sotelo, Nicaragua (.385/.393/.462)
 DH: José Velázquez, Puerto Rico (.308/.379/.462)
 RHP: Johnny Gregorius, Netherlands Antilles (2-0, 0 R, 5 H in 15 IP)
 LHP: Raymond Martes, Netherlands Antilles (1-1, 5.02)

See also
 Baseball awards#Americas
 Baseball at the Pan American Games
 Baseball at the Central American and Caribbean Games
 Baseball at the South American Games
 2004 Americas Olympic Baseball Qualifying Tournament

References

International baseball competitions hosted by Venezuela
2008 in Venezuelan sport
Copa América
Copa América
Ciudad Guayana
El Tigre
Copa América